The Progress World Women's Championship is a women's world professional wrestling championship created and promoted by the British professional wrestling promotion Progress Wrestling. It was announced on 24 April 2016, that Natural Progression Series IV would crown the first Progress Worlds Women's Champion. The tournament got underway in October 2016, with the champion to be crowned during the Super Strong Style 16 Tournament Edition 2017 weekend from 27 May 2017 to 29 May 2017. At the conclusion of the tournament at day two of the Super Strong Style 16 Tournament Edition 2016 weekend, Toni Storm was crowned the first Progress Women's Champion. The current title holder is Lana Austin who is in her first reign.

Title history

Natural Progression Series IV Tournament

Reigns

Combined reigns 

References

External links 
 Progress Women's Title History at Cagematch.net

Progress Wrestling championships
World professional wrestling championships
Women's professional wrestling championships